Jill Scott (1902–1974) was a British racing driver and aviator. She was described as "swashbuckling" and was a distinctive figure in motor racing, dressed in cherry-red from head-to-toe whenever she appeared at the race track.

She was born Eileen May Fountain in 1902 into a family made wealthy from their coal businesses.

Along with her first husband, William Berkeley "Bummer" Scott, she lived in a large house near the Brooklands race track in Surrey, England, and the couple were early and enthusiastic collectors of automobiles. They bought their first Sunbeam Indianapolis shortly after their marriage and quickly added several Bugattis to their collection. Their cars all wore a distinctive black livery with emerald green wheels, and the couple collected frequent trophies racing their Bugattis at the nearby track. Following the death of J. G. Parry-Thomas, they bought two of his cars, one of which Scott used to exceed 120 miles-per-hour on the Brooklands track, granting her the right to display a coveted British Automobile Racing Club badge acknowledging the achievement. In 1928 she became the first woman elected to the British Racing Drivers' Club.

In 1930 she divorced William and married another driver, Ernest Mortimer Thomas, who was also a former RAF pilot. Scott herself had learned to fly a few years earlier, in 1927, and operated an Avro Avian. She and her new husband continued to race at Brooklands for many years, her in an Alfa Romeo and him in a Frazer Nash.

Scott died in 1974. Thomas died a few months later.

Personal life

Jill and William Scott had a daughter, Sheila, who attended boarding schools and Cheltenham Ladies' College, and then Cambridge University.

References

External links
 

1902 births
1974 deaths
People from Surrey (before 1965)
Sportspeople from Surrey
Brooklands people
English racing drivers
English female racing drivers
English aviators